Urs Isler (born 10 June 1965) is a retired Swiss football player.

References

1965 births
Living people
Swiss men's footballers
FC Winterthur players
FC Baden players
FC Zürich players
Association football defenders
Swiss Super League players